List of airports in China may refer to:

 List of airports in China (People's Republic of China)
 List of airports in Taiwan (Republic of China)

See also:
 List of airports in Hong Kong
 List of airports in Macau